Punta punta is a species of skipper butterfly in the family Hesperiidae. It is the only species in the monotypic genus Punta.

References

Natural History Museum Lepidoptera genus database

Hesperiinae
Hesperiidae genera
Monotypic butterfly genera